Myki was a password manager and authenticator developed by Myki Security. Myki was available on iOS (requires iOS10 or higher) and Android (requires Android 5 or higher), as browser extensions on Chrome, Firefox, Safari, Opera and Microsoft Edge, and as a standalone desktop app for Windows, macOS, Linux, Arch Linux, and Debian. It was available in English, Arabic, French, German, Italian, Portuguese and Spanish. On 24 March 2022, MYKI announced JumpCloud's acquisition of Myki and on 10 April 2022, Myki ceased to operate.

Product overview
The Myki Password Manager and Authenticator was an offline (data stored on smartphone, not cloud) free mobile application for storing and managing passwords, credit cards, government IDs and notes. Myki was available on iOS and Android and was available as browser extensions on Chrome, Firefox. Safari and Opera. and as a standalone desktop app for Windows (requires Windows 8 or higher), macOS (requires MacOS 10.12 or higher), Linux (.appimage & .snap), Arch Linux (.pacman), and Debian (.deb).

Myki For Teams was an offline password manager for teams. Myki for Managed Service Providers enables MSPs to manage the passwords of the multiple companies they administer.

Myki was named one of the Best Password Managers of 2018 globally by PC Magazine.

History
Myki Security was founded in 2015 by Antoine Vincent Jebara and Priscilla Elora Sharuk. Myki launched its product in a private beta in September 2016.

In 2016, Myki was the first MENA-based company selected to compete in TechCrunch Disrupt Battlefield in San Francisco, California.

In January 2017, Myki raised $1.2 million from BECO Capital in Dubai, United Arab Emirates, Leap Ventures and B&Y Venture Partners in Beirut, Lebanon.

End of support 
On 24 February 2022, it was reported that JumpCloud, an American enterprise software company from Louisville, Colorado, acquired Myki Security. 

In March 2022, Myki announced the discontinuation of all products by 10 April 2022, pushing a support library to help users to export their data from Myki before that day. They also mentioned that they are confident that the world will encounter their products again in the future albeit under a different shape or form.

See also
 List of password managers
 LastPass
 Dashlane

References 

Password managers
Google Chrome extensions
2016 software
Nonfree Firefox WebExtensions